The Atwater Tract Office is a historic train station located in Glendale, California. The Atwater Tract Station was built in 1883, soon after Atwater Village had become a settlement. The Atwater Tract Office served the city of Glendale from 1883 until its closing and demolition in 1922.

History
In 1868, the area of which Atwater Village and most of modern-day Glendale was located was bought by a man named W.C.B. Richardson for the price of $51. The City of Los Angeles decided to have a railroad line run through Glendale so the citizens of Glendale would have an easier transportation to and from Los Angeles. After a railroad line was built through Glendale, the City of Los Angeles had a train station built near Atwater Village and gave the station the name of Atwater Tract Office because of its location next to Atwater Village. The Pacific Electric constructed their interurban line adjacent to the station in the early 1900s.

The Atwater Tract Station continued to serve the City of Glendale until 1922 when the City of Glendale decided it needed a larger station to serve more passengers. In January 1922, the Atwater Tract Office was shut down. Soon after the closing, it was demolished. Large droves of men came to Glendale to get a job building the new train station. Most of the workers who built the new train station made residence in Atwater Village and soon filled up every empty lot that was left in Atwater Village. In 1923, the new Glendale train station was completed. Most of the workers who built the new station stayed living in Atwater Village.

References

Buildings and structures in Glendale, California
Railway stations in Los Angeles County, California
Atwater Village, Los Angeles
Railway stations in the United States opened in 1883
Railway stations closed in 1922
Demolished buildings and structures in Los Angeles
Demolished railway stations in the United States
1883 establishments in California
1922 disestablishments in California
Transportation in Glendale, California
Glendale
Pacific Electric stations